The 1999 Kentucky Wildcats football team represented the University of Kentucky during the 1999 NCAA Division I-A football season. They participated as members of the Southeastern Conference in the Eastern Division. They played their home games at Commonwealth Stadium in Lexington, Kentucky. The team was coached by Hal Mumme.

Stadium expansion 
During the 1999 season, the beginning of the renovation to Commonwealth Stadium began. With very little seating, the stadium was in desperate need of a renovation that would allow more fans into the stadium to watch the Air Raid offense that was largely started by head coach, Hal Mumme. The renovation of the stadium allowed for forty new suites and approximately 68,000 new seats, costing around 24 million dollars. The new stadium expansion allowed the eager University of Kentucky fans to come watch more games. The fan base had just previously broken a record of attendance in the previous season by selling out the Outback Bowl for the first time in Tampa, Florida.

Schedule

References

Kentucky
Kentucky Wildcats football seasons
Kentucky Wildcats football